John G. Davies (1929–2020) was an Australian-American swimmer and US federal judge.

John G. Davies may also refer to:
John George Davies (1846–1913), Tasmanian politician, newspaper proprietor, and cricketer
John Gerwyn Davies (born 1959), Welsh footballer
John Goldup Davies (1914–1989), English swimmer
John Gordon Davies (1919–1990), British theologian
John Gwynoro Davies (1855–1935), Welsh Methodist minister

See also 
 John Davies (disambiguation)